Robert M. Collins is a United States Army major general who serves as deputy for acquisition and systems management at the Office of the United States Assistant Secretary of the Army for Acquisition, Logistics, and Technology. He previously served as the program executive officer for command, control, and communication (tactical) of the U.S. Army.

In January 2023, Collins was nominated for promotion to lieutenant general.

References

External links

Living people
United States Army generals
Year of birth missing (living people)